List of current BBC newsreaders and reporters
List of former BBC newsreaders and journalists